Bob Biggins (born 1946) is a former Republican member of the Illinois House of Representatives, representing the 41st district from 1993 to 2011. He retired in 2010.

Robert Biggins was born on October 20, 1946 in Oak Park, Illinois. Biggins has a Bachelor of Arts Degree in Education from Northeastern Illinois University.

In 1973, Biggins was elected as a Democrat to serve as the Assessor of Addison Township. He was elected as a Republican to the Illinois House of Representatives in 1990. Representative Biggins was the Republican Spokesperson for the Appropriations-General Services Committee, and served on six other committees: Aging, Executive, Mass Transit, Revenue and Finance, Tollway Oversight.

During the 2008 Republican Party presidential primaries, Biggins served on the Illinois leadership team of the presidential campaign of former New York City Mayor Rudy Giuliani.

On April 11, 2011, Governor Pat Quinn reappointed Biggins to the Board of Trustees for Northeastern Illinois University for a term starting October 28, 2011 and ending January 21, 2013 to replace Edward G. Dykla. Biggins was confirmed by the Illinois Senate on January 31, 2012. On April 11, 2013, Governor Pat Quinn reappointed Biggins to the Board of Trustees for Northeastern Illinois University for a term starting March 29, 2013 and ending January 21, 2019. Biggins was confirmed for the six-year term by the Illinois Senate on May 30, 2013.

Robert Biggins is married to Judy and together they have two children.

Robert Biggins has been a member of the following organizations: Board of Directors, Suburban Bank of Elmhurst, 1975–present, Chair/Board of Directors, Suburban Bank of Elmhurst, 1983-1984

References

External links
Illinois General Assembly - Representative Bob Biggins (R) 41st District official IL House website
Bills Committees
Project Vote Smart - Representative Robert A. 'Bob' Biggins (IL) profile
Follow the Money - Bob Biggins
2004 2002 2000 1998 1996 campaign contributions

1946 births
Living people
Republican Party members of the Illinois House of Representatives
Northeastern Illinois University alumni
21st-century American politicians